Heugleville-sur-Scie (literally Heugleville on Scie) is a commune in the Seine-Maritime department in the Normandy region in northern France. The poet and fabulist Désiré-François Le Filleul Des Guerrots (1778–1857) was born in the village.

Geography

Population

Places of interest
 The two chateau of Guerrots and Montpinçon, both dating from the nineteenth century.
 The church of St. Aubin, dating from the sixteenth century.
 A seventeenth century manorhouse.
 The ruins of a feudal castle.

See also
Communes of the Seine-Maritime department

References

Communes of Seine-Maritime